Luis Sprekelmeyer (born 15 April 2002) is a German footballer who plays as a centre-back for SV Lippstadt 08 on loan from  club VfL Osnabrück.

Club career
On 31 January 2022, Sprekelmeyer joined Sportfreunde Lotte on loan.

References

External links

2002 births
Living people
German footballers
Association football central defenders
VfL Osnabrück players
Sportfreunde Lotte players
SV Lippstadt 08 players
3. Liga players
Regionalliga players